Hunting My Dress is a 2009 album by Jesca Hoop, with most of the material written and recorded after the artist moved to Manchester, England. The album was written over the course of eighteen months and described as an 'unlikely weaving of hip-hop, Native American rhythms and birdsong'. The song 'Bed Across the Sea' relates the death of her mother and the beginning of a new romantic relationship. The album was launched at the artist's Chorlton home in "a lorry trailer in my back garden" and supported by a short UK tour. The song 'Murder of Birds' is a duet with Guy Garvey.

In 2014, Hoop released the album Undress with acoustic reinterpretations of the songs.

Track listing

 "Whispering Light" – 4:06
 "The Kingdom" – 3:50
 "Feast of the Heart" – 3:27	
 "Angel Mom" – 5:07
 "Four Dreams" – 4:58
 "Murder of Birds" – 4:35
 "Bed Across the Sea" – 3:36
 "Tulip" – 5:06
 "Hunting My Dress" – 4:56
 "My Boo" – 3:47 

Bonus EP (with US release)
 "Enemy" - 0:20
 "Intelligentactile 101" -  4:26	
 "Silverscreen" - 4:03	
 "My Boo" - 3:45	
 "Wintersong" - 4:18

Critical reception

References

2009 albums
Jesca Hoop albums